Thomas Dillard "Judge" Grubbs (February 22, 1894 – January 28, 1986) was a Major League Baseball pitcher who played in one game for the New York Giants on October 3, . He started the game for the Giants, pitching 5.0 innings, allowing nine hits, four earned runs, and taking the loss against the Philadelphia Phillies.

References

External links

1894 births
1986 deaths
Kentucky Wildcats baseball players
Major League Baseball pitchers
Baseball players from Kentucky
New York Giants (NL) players